The Curtiss XA-14 was a 1930s United States airplane, the first multi-engine attack aircraft tested by the United States Army Air Corps. Carrying a crew of two, it was as fast as the standard pursuit aircraft in service at the time.

Design and development
Originally built as an in-house venture as the Curtiss Model 76, powered by two experimental Wright XR-1510 radial engines, flight testing was sufficiently impressive that after the USAAC appraisal the Model 76 was returned to Curtiss and fitted with two  Wright R-1670-5 Whirlwind engines with two-position variable-pitch propellers. This configuration was accepted by the Army with the designation XA-14. It had standard Army markings with the serial number 36-146.

The Model 76 was of all-metal construction with an oval section semimonocoque fuselage, described as "pencil slim". The XA-14 was extensively tested, at one stage being fitted with a  cannon in the nose.

In July 1936, 13 developed versions, re-engined with two  Wright R-1820-47 Cyclone 9-cylinder radials, were ordered into production as the Y1A-18.

Specifications (XA-14)

See also

References

Notes

Bibliography

 Eden, Paul and Soph Moeng, eds. The Complete Encyclopedia of World Aircraft. London: Amber Books Ltd., 2002. .
 Fahey, James C. U.S. Army Aircraft 1908-1946. New York: Ships and Aircraft, 1946.
 Fitzsimons, Bernard, ed. The Illustrated Encyclopedia of the 20th Century Weapons and Warfare, Vol. 21. London: Purnell & Sons Ltd. 1967/1969. .
 Swanborough, F. Gordon and Peter M. Bowers. United States Military Aircraft Since 1909. New York: Putnam, 1964. .
 Wagner, Ray. ‘’American Combat Planes, Third Enlarged Edition.’’ Garden City, New York: Doubleday & Company, Inc. 1982 .

A-14
A-14, Curtiss
Mid-wing aircraft
Aircraft first flown in 1935
Twin piston-engined tractor aircraft